Palaniappan Chidambaram (born 16 September 1945), better known as P. Chidambaram, is an Indian politician and lawyer who currently serves as Member of Parliament, Rajya Sabha. He served as the Chairman of the Parliamentary Standing Committee on Home Affairs from 2017 to 2018.

Chidambaram has served as the Union Minister of Finance four times. Most recently, he held the role for the entirety of the United Progressive Alliance government from 2004 to 2014, except for a three-year period as Minister of Home Affairs, during which he oversaw India's domestic security response to the 26/11 terrorist attack in Mumbai. Chidambaram returned as Finance Minister in July 2012, succeeding Pranab Mukherjee, who resigned to become the President of India.

Early life and education
Chidambaram was born to Kandanur L. Ct. L. Palaniappa Chettiar and Lakshmi Achi in Kanadukathan in the Sivaganga district in the state of Tamil Nadu, India. His maternal grandfather was Raja Sir Annamalai Chettiar, a wealthy merchant and banker from Chettinad.

Chidambaram did his schooling at the Madras Christian College Higher Secondary School, Chennai  he passed the one-year pre-University course from Loyola College, Chennai. After graduating with a BSc degree in statistics from the Presidency College, Chennai, he completed his Bachelor of Laws from the Madras Law College (now Dr. Ambedkar Government Law College) and his MBA from Harvard Business School in the class of 1968. He also holds a master's degree from Loyola College, Chennai.

During this time his politics inclined to the left and in 1969 he joined N. Ram, later an editor of The Hindu, and the women's activist Mythili Sivaraman in starting a journal called the Radical Review.

Chidambaram has two brothers and one sister. His father's business interests covered textiles, trading and plantations in India. He chose to concentrate on his legal practice and stayed away from the family business.

He enrolled as a lawyer in the Madras High Court, becoming a senior advocate in 1984. He had offices in Delhi and Chennai and practiced in the Supreme Court and various high courts of India.

Political career

Chidambaram was elected to the Lok Sabha (lower house) of the Indian Parliament from the Sivaganga constituency of Tamil Nadu in general elections held in 1984. He was a union leader for MRF and worked his way up in the Congress party. He was the Tamil Nadu Youth Congress president and then the general secretary of the Tamil Nadu Pradesh Congress Committee unit. He was inducted into the Union (Indian federal) Council of Ministers in the government headed by Prime Minister Rajiv Gandhi on 21 September 1985 as a Deputy Minister in the Ministry of Commerce and then in the Ministry of Personnel. His main actions during his tenure in this period was to control the price of tea and he has been criticized by the Government of Sri Lanka for destroying the Sri Lankan tea trade by fixing the prices of the commodity in India using state power. He was elevated to the rank of Minister of State in the Ministry of Personnel, Public Grievances and Pensions in January 1986. In October of the same year, he was appointed to the Ministry of Home Affairs as Minister of State for Internal Security. He continued to hold both offices until general elections were called in 1989. The Indian National Congress government was defeated in the general elections of 1989.

In June 1991, Chidambaram was inducted as a Minister of State (Independent Charge) in the Ministry of Commerce, by the then Prime Minister Mr P V Narasimha Rao; a post he held till July 1992. He was later re-appointed Minister of State (Independent Charge) in the Ministry of Commerce in February 1995 and held the post until April 1996. He made some radical changes in India's export-import (EXIM) policy, while at the Ministry of Commerce.

In 1996, Chidambaram quit the Congress party and joined a breakaway faction of the Tamil Nadu state unit of the Congress party called the Tamil Maanila Congress (TMC). In the general elections held in 1996, TMC along with a few national and regional level opposition parties, formed a coalition government. The coalition government came as a big break for Chidambaram, who was given the key cabinet portfolio of Finance. His 1997 budget is still remembered as the dream budget for the Indian economy. The coalition government was a short-lived one (it fell in 1998), but he was reappointed to the same portfolio in the government formed by Prime Minister Manmohan Singh in 2004.

In 1998, the Bharatiya Janata Party (BJP) took the reins of the government for the first time and it was not until May 2004 that Chidambaram would be back in government. Chidambaram became Minister of Finance again in the Congress party led United Progressive Alliance government on 24 May 2004. During the intervening period Chidambaram made some experiments in his political career, leaving the TMC in 2001 and forming his own party, the Congress Jananayaka Peravai, largely focused on the regional politics of Tamil Nadu. The party failed to take off into mainstream Tamil Nadu or national politics. Just before the elections of 2004, he merged his party with the mainstream Congress party and when the Congress won the election, he was inducted into the Council of Ministers under the new Prime Minister Manmohan Singh as cabinet Minister of Finance.

On 30 November 2008, he was appointed the Union Home Minister following the resignation of Shivraj Patil who had come under intense pressure to tender his resignation following a series of terror attacks in India, including the Mumbai attacks on 26 November 2008.

He has been credited with taking the bold decision of prioritising elections above corporate demands to deploy security for the 2009 Indian Premier League.

In 2009, Chidambaram was re-elected from the Sivaganga Lok Sabha constituency in the Congress and retained the Home ministry. He was one of the representatives of the central government when a tri-party agreement was signed with the Gorkha Hill Council and the Government of West Bengal, an agreement which was a result of Mamata Banerjee's effort to end a decade long unrest in the hills of Darjeeling.

The Indian National Congress appointed P. Chidambaram as one of thirteen senior spokespersons on 15 September 2014.
He ceded his seat to his son Karti in 2014, which resulted in electoral defeat for his son. In 2016, he was elected as an MP of the Rajya Sabha, the upper house of Indian parliament from the state of Maharashtra.

Parliamentary Committee assignments 
 13 Sept. 2021 onwards: Member Committee on External Affairs.

Own party 
Congress Jananayaka Peravai, formerly TMC Janayaka Peravai (Congress Democratic Front)  was a political party in the Indian state of Tamil Nadu. It was founded in 2001 by  former union finance minister P. Chidambaram, as a splinter group of the Tamil Maanila Congress, when the TMC allied itself with the All India Anna Dravida Munnetra Kazhagam. 2001 Tamil Nadu Legislative Assembly election P. Chidambaram other side Party DMK-BJP (NDA) Joint Meet to Assembly election.In October 2001, the party renamed itself as Congress Janayaka Peravai by dropping the TMC prefix.

In the 2004 Lok Sabha elections Chidambaram ran as the Indian National Congress candidate from Sivagangai, and won with 400 393 votes (60,01%).

On 25 November 2004 CJP merged into the Indian National Congress. Discussions about a merger had taken place during a long time, but the merger was resisted by the Tamil Nadu Congress leadership. In the end the merger was pushed through by the national Congress leadership.

Family and personal life
Chidambaram's mother, Lakshmi Acchi, was the daughter of Sir Annamalai Chettiar, a banker and merchant, and was granted the title of Raja by British. Annamalai Chettiar was the founder of Annamalai University and United India Insurance Company Limited. His brother, Ramaswami Chettiar, was the founder of the Indian Bank and the co-founder of another major bank, the Indian Overseas Bank.

He is married to Nalini Chidambaram, daughter of Justice (Retd.) Palapatti Sadaya Goundar Kailasam, of the Supreme Court, and Mrs. Soundra Kailasam, a renowned Tamil poet and author. Nalini Chidambaram is a senior advocate practising in the Madras High Court and the Supreme Court of India. He has a son, Karti P. Chidambaram, who graduated with a BBA degree from the University of Texas, Austin, and a Masters in Law from the University of Cambridge. Karti, a member of the Congress Party's AICC, is active in Tamil Nadu state politics. Karti is married to Dr. Srinidhi Rangarajan, a well-known Bharathanatyam dancer and medical doctor, working with the Apollo Group of Hospitals in Chennai. Karti and Srinidhi have a daughter, Aditi Nalini Chidambaram.

Health Issues 

He suffers from a medical condition referred to as crohn's disease.

Controversies

The Voluntary Disclosure of Income Scheme (VDIS) 1997, which he announced when he was Finance Minister with the United Front government, was condemned by the Controller and Auditor General of India as abusive because of the loopholes that made it possible to fudge data to the financial advantage of the confessor.

Chidambaram was criticised for his ministry's failure to prevent the 2011 Mumbai bombings, despite massive investments in security following the 2008 Mumbai attacks. Three years after the 2008 attacks, security preparations were proven to be inadequate with channel breakdown and failures in modernising, procuring, and installing security equipment. Chidambaram defended the agencies under his ministry against the charge of intelligence failure with the response which was later ridiculed by many people in India and its media:

Tamil Nadu Chief Minister Jayaram Jayalalithaa wrote to the Chief Election Commissioner in 2011 that data entry operators at Sivaganga had transferred 3,400 votes polled by Kannappan from 11 polling stations in Chidambaram's favour. News reports suggest that on May 16, 2009, the AIADMK candidate Raja Kannappan was declared elected by 3555 votes at 12.30 pm, and the news was also broadcast on television. But in a dramatic reversal a few hours later, P Chidambaram was declared elected by 3354 votes at 4.30 pm, and was confirmed as the winner after a recount at 8.30 pm.

On 7 April 2009, Chidambaram was assaulted by Sikh journalist Jarnail Singh during a press conference in Delhi on the issue of a "clean chit" to Jagdish Tytler. Singh, who writes for the Hindi daily newspaper Dainik Jagaran was dissatisfied with Chidamabaram's answer to a question on the Central Bureau of Investigation's (CBI) "clean chit" regarding Jagdish Tytler's involvement in the 1984 anti-Sikh riots. It was the first shoe throwing incident in India.

Chidambaram was part of Vedanta's legal team and on its board before becoming finance minister in 2004 [42]. In 2002, a year before UK's Financial Services Authority allowed Sterlite to reconstitute itself as Vedanta Resources Plc, the Enforcement Directorate (ED) served a show-cause notice on three of Chairman Anil Agarwal's family. The notice was a demand that Sterlite directors answer allegations about using their holding companies-Volcan and Twinstar-to avoid paying taxes on forex transactions. It was a polite way of saying there was prima facie evidence, dating back to 1993, that the Agarwals were guilty of money laundering. For seven years the case dragged on in courts as Sterlite employed top lawyers to use every possible delaying tactic. P. Chidambaram argued in Sterlite's defence in a 2003 Bombay High Court case related to the ED's allegations. The following year, Chidambaram found himself appointed non-executive director on the board of Vedanta Resources Plc. And very soon, he became finance minister in UPA 1.

Former Union Minister and Senior Advocate Ram Jethmalani's letter to Chidambaram on 6 December 2013 accused him of acting in collusion with the NDTV and laundering Rs 5000 crores of money through Mauritius route back to India.

INX Media, Aircel-Maxis case 

In 2006, political leader Dr. Subramanian Swamy alleged that a company controlled by Karti Chidambaram, the son of Minister of Finance P. Chidambaram, received a five-percent share of Aircel to get part of 40 billion paid by Maxis Communications for the 74-percent share of Aircel. According to Swamy, Chidambaram withheld Foreign Investment Promotion Board clearance of the deal until his son received the five-percent share in Siva's company. The issue was raised a number of times in Parliament by the opposition, which demanded Chidambaram's resignation. Although Chidambaram and the then ruling Congress government denied the allegations, The Pioneer and India Today reported the existence of documents showing that Chidambaram delayed approval of the foreign direct investment proposal by about seven months. It was alleged that Chidambaram's son, Karti was a direct beneficiary of the 2G spectrum case. His company,  Advantage Strategic Consulting  had a five per cent stake in Aircel Televentures, even as his father P Chidambaram, as Finance minister, was alleged to have offered FIPB clearance for the Aircel-Maxis deal only if his son's company, Advantage Strategic Consulting, got shares in Aircel Ventures. The Enforcement Directorate is currently investigating his involvement in Aircel deal. In 2012, and, subsequently, in 2016, information of wide-scale corruption by Chidambaram's son Karti Chidambaram and Robert Vadra, with the help of his father's position, including through the Airtel–Maxis deal and the Uttar Pradesh NRHM scam, was unveiled in prominent newspapers and media in India. Simultaneously, Chidambaram and his son Karti have been dogged with allegations of corruption, misuse of position, insider trading and money laundering.

Imprisonment

On 20 August 2019, the Delhi High Court dismissed both anticipatory bail pleas of Chidambaram in connection with corruption charges in the INX Media case during his tenure as Finance minister in UPA Government. On 21 August, he appeared at the Congress HQ and addressed a press conference stating that he was "not accused"; however, he left the place, and, later, he was arrested by the Central Bureau of Investigation and Enforcement Directorate at his home. On 5 September 2019, Supreme Court dismissed his appeal against rejection of anticipatory bail plea by Delhi High Court. The Special Court ordered Chidambaram to stay in judicial custody in Tihar Jail for 14 days. On 4 December he was granted bail by the supreme court.

Books, research papers and journals
Chidambaram is a published author of several books.

Books
 Fearless in Opposition: Power and Accountability (Publisher: Rupa Publications India)
 Standing Guard: A Year in Opposition (Publisher: Rupa Publications India)
 Speaking Truth to Power: My Alternative View (Publisher: Rupa Publications India)
 Undaunted: Saving the Idea of India (Publisher: Rupa Publications India)
 A View from the Outside: Why Good Economics Works for Everyone (Publisher: Penguin India)

Books featuring Chidambaram
 An Agenda for India's Growth: Essays in Honour of P. Chidambaram (Publisher: Academic Foundation)

See also
Outcome Budget: 2005–06
2G spectrum case

References

External links

 Cabinet of Prime Minister Manmohan Singh Prime Ministers Office, Archived
 Profile at BBC News
 Interview with Charlie Rose in April 2013

1945 births
Living people
People from Tamil Nadu
India MPs 1984–1989
India MPs 1989–1991
India MPs 1991–1996
India MPs 1996–1997
India MPs 1998–1999
India MPs 2004–2009
India MPs 2009–2014
Harvard Business School alumni
Indian National Congress politicians
Tamil Maanila Congress politicians
Indian Hindus
Lok Sabha members from Tamil Nadu
Indian National Congress politicians from Tamil Nadu
Presidency College, Chennai alumni
Union Ministers from Tamil Nadu
University of Madras alumni
Rajya Sabha members from Maharashtra
People from Sivaganga district
Indian prisoners and detainees
Inmates of Tihar Jail
Finance Ministers of India
Ministers for Corporate Affairs
Ministers of Internal Affairs of India
Commerce and Industry Ministers of India